Game Merchant was a gaming magazine first published in 1981, and was edited by Alex Marciniszyn.

Contents
Game Merchant was a magazine that included news from the gaming hobby as well as upcoming products, submitted by game manufacturers.

Reception
Lewis Pulsipher reviewed Game Merchant in The Space Gamer No. 43. Pulsipher commented that "Without seeing the subscribers-only material I cannot say with certainty whether this publication is worth [the annual price].  However, the supplements will have to be extraordinarily long or good."

References

Game magazines